"Mistake" is a single by musician Mike Oldfield, released in 1982.

Release 
It was not included on any Oldfield album in Europe until the compilation The Complete Mike Oldfield in 1985; however, it was included as an extra track on the North American release of the album Crises in 1983.  Maggie Reilly performs vocals on "Mistake".

Track listing 
 "Mistake" – 2:55
 "Waldberg (The Peak)" – 3:24

Charts

References 

1982 singles
Mike Oldfield songs
Songs written by Mike Oldfield
Virgin Records singles
1982 songs